Helen Hemphill (born July 1, 1955) is an author in the Children's Literature genre.

Biography
Helen Delane Hemphill was born in Bridgeport, Texas on July 1, 1955. She received her BA from Midwestern State University in Wichita Falls in 1977. She also earned her MFA in Writing for Children & Young Adults from Vermont College and MA in English Literature from Belmont University in Nashville, Tennessee.

Hemphill lives with her family in Nashville, Tennessee.

Career
Helen Hemphill worked for 20 years in advertising and public relations prior to her second career in teaching. She taught 6th grade language arts for four years at Oak Hill School in Nashville, was a writer in residence for Franklin Road Academy in Nashville (2009-2010), an adjunct instructor at Peabody College at Vanderbilt University (2010-2011), and directed The Whole Novel Workshop for the Highlights Foundation (2012-2013).  She is a trainer for The Six Traits Writing model and a teaching fellow for the National Writing Project.

She has three books so far in her career as an author, all published by Front Street, an imprint of Boyds Mills Press. Her first book was Long Gone Daddy, published in 2006. Her next book, Runaround, was published in 2007. Her latest book, The Adventurous Deeds of Deadwood Jones, was published in 2008. Hemphill is currently working on a YA thriller.

Published works
 Long Gone Daddy (2006): After a rift with his preacher father, 14-year-old narrator Harlan Q Stank apprentices with a local mortician. The boy meets his grandfather, Harlan O, for the first time in his employer's basement where the old man lies smiling on the cooling table, having suffered a fatal heart attack. After learning that an inheritance of $50,000 and an Eldorado convertible await, provided that the body arrives back in Sin City for burial, Harlan Q talks Paps into driving Grandfather back. The two embark on a road trip in the church station wagon with the casketed Grandfather inside. The pair pick up Warrior (aka Warren Ducklo), a handsome 19-year-old aspiring actor due to a flat tire. Warrior, who has Buddhist leanings, and Paps argue back and forth about their religious viewpoints, which serves to emphasize Harlan Q's struggle to be free of his father.
 Runaround (2007): Eleven-year-old Sassy learned everything she knows about love comes from her True Confessions magazines.   handsome neighbor, Boon, she wants more details. Neither her widowed father, her old-maid housekeeper, nor her gorgeous sister, Lula, will give her more information on the subject.  Lula, who has no problem in the boyfriends department, sets up Sassy for embarrassment, so Sassy vows revenge.  She is going to win the handsome boy next door, Boon, and teach Lula a lesson while she is at it.
 The Adventurous Deeds of Deadwood Jones (2008): This novel was inspired by the famous "dime novels" about "Deadwood Dick" written by Edward L. Wheeler and the autobiography of African American cowboy Nat Love, whom Wheeler loosely based his stories on.  Prometheus Jones runs afoul of two rednecks who refuse to let a black man, even a born freeman, keep a horse he won with a raffle ticket. As soon as things go south, Prometheus jumps on the horse with his cousin Omer and leaves town. The pair joins a Texas cattle drive heading for Deadwood, South Dakota.  What follows is a classic, well-researched Wild West yarn set in the days of Manifest Destiny, Indian wars, and the gold rush.

Awards and nominations
Long Gone Daddy
 2007 Teddy Award - Writers' League of Texas
 Books for the Teen Age - New York Public Library
 Best of the Fest - Texas Book Festival - Austin Magazine

Runaround
 Top Ten Youth Romances - Booklist
 Starred Review - Booklist
 Starred Review - Library Media Connections

The Adventurous Deeds of Deadwood Jones
 VOYA 2009 Top Shelf Fiction - Middle School Readers
 Nominated - 2011 Beehive Book Awards - Children's Literature Association of Utah
 Best Books of 2009 - Nebraska Library Association
 Virginia M. Law Award for the “most distinguished book for young adults on Texas History”
 Best Children's Books - Bank State College
 Kansas State Reading Circle 2009 Recommended Reading List
 Nominated - 2009 SIBA Book Award
 Winter 2008-2009 Kid's Indie Next List

References

External links

 Author's Website
 Children's Literature Network
 Boyds Mills Press
 Publishers Weekly

21st-century American novelists
American women novelists
American children's writers
American writers of young adult literature
Midwestern State University alumni
Vermont College of Fine Arts alumni
Belmont University alumni
Living people
1955 births
American women children's writers
21st-century American women writers
Women writers of young adult literature
People from Bridgeport, Texas